Kerry James Horn (born August 2, 1986) is a Canadian actor and producer, known for Aliens in America (2007), best known for his role as Caleb O'Dell on the CBC series Heartland.

Biography 
James was born in Mission, British Columbia.

Filmography

References

External links 
 Kerry James Official Website
 
 CBC website

1986 births
Living people
Canadian male film actors
Canadian male television actors
Male actors from British Columbia
People from Mission, British Columbia